Trichaphodius moorei, is a species of dung beetle native to India and Sri Lanka.

The dorsal surface is uniformly yellowish brown. Elytra with a light pre-apical spot which is surrounded by darker marking.

References 

Scarabaeidae
Insects of Sri Lanka
Insects of India
Insects described in 1936